Keith Adams (born 6 June 1934) is a former English first-class cricketer.  Adams was a right-handed batsman.  He was born at Aberford, Yorkshire.

While studying at the University of Cambridge, Adams made a single first-class appearance for Cambridge University against Middlesex at Fenner's in 1954.  Adams opened the batting for Cambridge University, being dismissed for a duck by Don Bennett in their first-innings, while in their second-innings he was dismissed for 34 runs by Charles Robins.  Middlesex won the match by 4 wickets.

References

External links
Keith Adams at ESPNcricinfo

1930s births
Living people
People from Aberford
Alumni of the University of Cambridge
English cricketers
Cambridge University cricketers
Cricketers from Leeds